Ranlequin de Mol (15th century) was a Dutch composer. His only known and performed work is a motet, Ave decus virginum, for four voices.

References

Dutch composers
15th-century composers